El Kabir Pene, born 18 December 1984 in Thiès, Senegal, is a Senegalese basketball player.

Statistics
 Height : 1m90
 Position : guard
 Regular number:

Biography 

He plays as a guard for the Senegal national basketball team.
El Kabir Pene participated in the 2006 World Championships in Japan.

Clubs 

 2003 - 2005 :  US Gorée (1st division)
 December 2005 - May 2006 :  Stade Clermontois (Pro A)
 May 2006 - June 2006 :  Vichy (Pro B)
 2006 - 2007 :  Stade Clermontois (Pro A)
 2008 - 2009 : ASM Basket Le Puy-en-Velay (France)

Career with the Senegal national team 
Senegalese international, El Kabir Pene participated in the African Championships in 2005 and the 2006 World Championships in Japan.

Titles
  Silver medal at the 2005 African Championships, (Alger, Algeria)

External links
  www.allbasketball.com
  World Statistics 2006
  His profile at the LNB site

1984 births
Living people
African Games medalists in basketball
African Games silver medalists for Senegal
Competitors at the 2003 All-Africa Games
Senegalese expatriate basketball people in France
Senegalese men's basketball players
Sportspeople from Thiès
2006 FIBA World Championship players